Omid Hamedifar (Persian امیدحامدی فر, born August 20, 2000) is an Iranian footballer who currently plays for Esteghlal in the Persian Gulf Pro League.

Club career

Sanat Naft
Hamedifar made his debut for Sanat Naft in 13th fixtures of 2019–20 Iran Pro League against Paykan while he substituted in for Moslem Mojademi.

Esteghlal 
On 28 June 2022, he signed a 2-year contract with Esteghlal.

Honours 
Esteghlal

Iranian Super Cup:  2022

References

2000 births
Living people
Sanat Naft Abadan F.C. players
Esteghlal F.C. players
Iranian footballers
Association football midfielders